Joshua Helman (born 22 February 1986) is an Australian television and film actor. Helman played William Stryker in X-Men: Days of Future Past, and its sequel, X-Men: Apocalypse. He has also appeared in the 2015 installment of the Mad Max franchise, Mad Max: Fury Road, as Slit. Helman has also appeared on a number of television series and mini-series, including recurring roles in Home and Away, The Pacific, Flesh and Bone and Wayward Pines.

Early life
Helman was born in Adelaide, South Australia.

Career
Helman started acting when he got a recurring role on the Australian television show Home and Away in 2007, playing Denni Maitland. He then got a small role in a short film Aidan's View where he played the role of an intruder trying to break into the house of the protagonist. A few years later, he was cast as Cpl. Lew "Chuckler" Juergens in the American television show, The Pacific. He appeared in 6 episodes. He was then signed on by American talent agency The Gersh Agency. He made his major studio motion picture debut in 2012 when he was cast as Jeb Oliver in Jack Reacher. He returned to Australia and was cast in Blinder, a film based on Australian rules football drama. In 2011, Helman acted in the original production of Small Engine Repair at Theatre Theater in Los Angeles; he will also take part in its film adaption, filmed Winter 2019.

He co-starred in the ensemble Marvel Comics film, X-Men: Days of Future Past, as William Stryker—shown, through footage, to be the younger/1973 version of the Stryker played by Brian Cox in X2 (2003). He later played Slit, alongside two-time fellow X-Men actor Nicholas Hoult, in the Mad Max sequel Mad Max: Fury Road (2015). In 2016, he had a main role in season two of the television series Wayward Pines.

Filmography

References

External links
 

1986 births
Australian male film actors
Australian male stage actors
Australian male television actors
Living people
Male actors from Adelaide
21st-century Australian male actors